Frankfort-Highland Airport  is a privately owned, public use airport located west of Frankfort, a village in the Town of Frankfort, Herkimer County, New York, United States. The airport is southeast of Utica, a city in Oneida County. It is included in the National Plan of Integrated Airport Systems for 2011–2015, which categorized it as a general aviation facility.

Facilities and aircraft 
Frankfort-Highland Airport covers an area of 45 acres (18 ha) at an elevation of 1,325 feet (404 m) above mean sea level. It has one runway designated 13/31 with an asphalt surface measuring 2,550 by 30 feet (777 x 9 m).

For the 12-month period ending September 13, 2012, the airport had 11,980 aircraft operations, an average of 32 per day: 99% general aviation and 1% military.

References

External links 
 Frankfort-Highland (6B4) at NYSDOT Airport Directory
 Aerial image as of May 1995 from USGS The National Map
 

Airports in New York (state)
Transportation buildings and structures in Herkimer County, New York